A with macron (А̄ а̄; italics: А̄ а̄) is a letter of the Cyrillic script. In all its forms it looks exactly like the Latin letter A with macron (Ā ā Ā ā).

A with macron is used in the Aleut (Bering dialect), Evenki, Ingush, Mansi, Nanai, Orok, Ulch, Kildin Sami, Selkup, and Chechen languages.

A with macron also appears in the Bulgarian and Serbian languages in some dialects.

Computing codes
Being a relatively recent letter, not present in any legacy 8-bit Cyrillic encoding, the letter А̄ is not represented directly by a precomposed character in Unicode either; it has to be composed as А+◌̄ (U+0304).

Usage

South Slavic languages
A with macron is used in the South Slavic languages mostly in Bulgarian usually used before or after another stressed vowel: глāвà, крāкà, овчāрè, ковāчè, юнāцѝ, and граждāнè.

See also
A a : Latin letter A
Ā ā : Latin letter A with macron - a Latvian, Latgalian, Livonian, and Samogitian letter
А а : Cyrillic letter А
Cyrillic characters in Unicode

References

Cyrillic letters with diacritics
Letters with macron